Sir Hugh Purves-Hume-Campbell, 7th Baronet (15 December 1812 – 30 January 1894) was a British Conservative and Tory politician.

He was the son of William Purves-Hume-Campbell and Charlotte Rey. In 1834, he married Margaret Penelope Spottiswoode, daughter of John Spottiswoode and Helen Wauchope, and they had one child: Helen Purves-Hume-Campbell (–1875).

Purves-Hume-Campbell was first elected Tory MP for Berwickshire at a by-election in 1834—caused by the death of Charles Albany Marjoribanks—and held the seat until 1847, when he did not seek re-election. A keen cricketer, he played first-class cricket twice for the Marylebone Cricket Club in 1837, playing at Lord's against Oxford University and Cambridge University.

He succeeded to the Baronetcy of Purves Hall in 1833 upon the death of his father. Upon his own death in 1894, the title was inherited by John Home-Purves-Hume-Campbell.

References

External links
 

Conservative Party (UK) MPs for English constituencies
Tory MPs (pre-1834)
Baronets in the Baronetage of the United Kingdom
UK MPs 1832–1835
UK MPs 1835–1837
UK MPs 1837–1841
UK MPs 1841–1847
1812 births
1894 deaths
Scottish cricketers
Marylebone Cricket Club cricketers